= Bowling at the 2010 South American Games – Men's trios =

The Men's trios event at the 2010 South American Games was held on March 26 at 9:00.

== Medalists ==
Gold	Silver	Bronze
Manuel Otalora; Andrés Gómez; Jaime González; Colombia	Ricardo Javier Rosa; Jonathan Ariel Hocsman; Christian Dalmasso Bonnet; Argentina	Rafael Eduardo Medina; Luis Richard Olivo; Ildemaro Ricardo Ruiz; Venezuela

== Results ==
Rank	Team	Athlete	Games						Total	Avg	Grand
Rank	Team	Athlete	G1	G2	G3	G4	G5	G6	Total	Avg	Grand
1st place, gold medalist(s)	Colombia	Jaime González (COL)	197	221	181	205	212	216	1232	205.3	3825
1st place, gold medalist(s)	Colombia	Andrés Gómez (COL)	210	183	194	244	230	195	1256	209.3	3825
1st place, gold medalist(s)	Colombia	Manuel Otalora (COL)	240	214	209	237	207	230	1337	222.8	3825
2nd place, silver medalist(s)	Argentina	Ricardo Javier Rosa (ARG)	192	163	150	228	186	244	1163	193.8	3792
2nd place, silver medalist(s)	Argentina	Jonathan Ariel Hocsman (ARG)	200	192	248	268	177	287	1372	228.7	3792
2nd place, silver medalist(s)	Argentina	Christian Fernando Dalmasso (ARG)	166	199	242	210	224	216	1257	209.5	3792
3rd place, bronze medalist(s)	Venezuela	Rafael Eduardo Medina (VEN)	248	288	192	230	186	221	1365	227.5	3755
3rd place, bronze medalist(s)	Venezuela	Luis Richard Olivo (VEN)	183	211	199	227	210	227	1257	209.5	3755
3rd place, bronze medalist(s)	Venezuela	Ildemaro Ricardo Ruis (VEN)	176	182	206	182	192	195	1133	188.8	3755
4	Chile	Harold Andrés Pickering (CHI)	173	187	141	178	246	216	1141	190.2	3620
4	Chile	Luis Felipe Gonzalez (CHI)	224	185	215	214	204	220	1262	210.3	3620
4	Chile	Adrian Reyes Vargas (CHI)	234	203	205	156	215	204	1217	202.8	3620
5	Brazil	Juliano Oliveira (BRA)	225	183	231	233	225	198	1295	215.8	3570
5	Brazil	Charles Robini (BRA)	201	202	187	184	206	171	1151	191.8	3570
5	Brazil	Marcio Vieira (BRA)	200	184	174	192	177	197	1124	187.3	3570
6	Paraguay	Alejandro Carricarte (PAR)	195	256	230	240	194	189	1304	217.3	3538
6	Paraguay	Jorge Luis Alarcon (PAR)	230	162	212	146	187	191	1128	188.0	3538
6	Paraguay	Chieh Hsiao Tzu (PAR)	188	211	189	169	172	177	1106	184.3	3538
7	Bolivia	Pablo Hinojosa Rojas (BOL)	201	254	222	165	160	171	1173	195.5	3537
7	Bolivia	Sebastian Nemtala Garcia (BOL)	188	211	157	251	165	169	1141	190.2	3537
7	Bolivia	Ignacio Rojas Patino (BOL)	228	173	234	203	195	190	1223	203.8	3537
8	Peru	Denis Richard Toyoda (PER)	199	171	181	199	169	152	1071	178.5	3423
8	Peru	Eduardo Fujinaka (PER)	222	181	166	191	238	163	1161	193.5	3423
8	Peru	Adolfo Edgardo Chang (PER)	208	155	214	179	223	212	1191	198.5	3423
9	Aruba	Nelson Kelly (ARU)	150	169	181	158	191	180	1029	171.5	3300
9	Aruba	Jason Odor (ARU)	166	189	213	192	166	222	1148	191.3	3300
9	Aruba	Laurence Wilming (ARU)	194	232	170	180	165	182	1123	187.2	3300
10	Netherlands Antilles	Carlos Finx (AHO)	224	224	141	196	212	153	1150	191.7	3221
10	Netherlands Antilles	Felix Ibañez (AHO)	147	196	151	160	180	141	975	162.5	3221
10	Netherlands Antilles	Tarik Samander (AHO)	181	158	195	237	167	158	1096	182.7	3221
NR	Ecuador 2	Dioegenes Jose Borja (ECU)	195	185	180	252	198	227	1237	206.2	1237
NR	Bolivia 2	Oscar Guillermo Candia (BOL)	203	203	167	148	176	223	1120	186.7	1120
NR	Ecuador 1	Jorge Luis Perez (ECU)	154	180	190	189	155	166	1034	172.3	1034
